The Virtue Party is a Salafist political party. The party stated in September 2012 that it and the Renaissance Party would merge.

Mahmoud Fathy, the founding deputy chairman, stated that the goals of the party are: to "achieve justice and equality for all citizens, equal distribution of wealth, and to guarantee legal prosecution of anyone who commits a crime against the people". Other party principles include "reform, supporting state institutions in accordance with the constitution, and restoring Egypt’s leading role in the Arab and Islamic worlds". Mostafa Mohamed, a member of the party, said that even Christians can join the party.

The party supported Hazem Salah Abu Ismail in the May 2012 Egyptian presidential election.

Lawsuit against Islamic parties 
The Virtue Party is one of the eleven Islamic parties targeted by a lawsuit in November 2014, when an organization named Popular Front for opposing the Brotherhoodization of Egypt sought to dissolve all political parties established "on a religious basis." The Alexandria Urgent Matters Court however ruled on 26 November 2014 that it lacked jurisdiction.

References

2011 establishments in Egypt
Conservative parties in Egypt
Islamic political parties in Egypt
Political parties established in 2011
Political parties in Egypt
Salafi groups
Sunni Islamic political parties